Revolution Per Minute is the sixth studio album by Canadian rock band Big Sugar and the band's first album released since reuniting in 2010. The album debuted at #34 on the Canadian Albums Chart.

Track listing
Roads Ahead - 2:21
Come A Little Closer … Now Come! - 4:30
Little Bit A All Right - 4:03
It’s All I Know - 5:20
If I Were Heaven (Tonight) - 4:17
Done So Much In The Dark - 4:03
Work It Now! - 3:14
Un-Employed Expert - 3:40
Counterfeit Wings (Are Some Jive Ass Wings) - 4:21
There’s No Tellin’ Me - 4:33
True Believers - 3:23
A Revolution Per Minute - 5:07
Devil in The Launderette (iTunes bonus track) - 3:12
Insatiable (iTunes bonus track) - 3:52

References

2011 albums
Big Sugar albums